Atrichotoxon usambarense is a species of air-breathing land snail, a terrestrial pulmonate gastropod mollusk in the family Helicarionidae. This species is endemic to Tanzania.

References

Atrichotoxon
Endemic fauna of Tanzania
Taxonomy articles created by Polbot